General Francis D. Vavala (born June 28, 1947) is a retired Army National Guard officer who served as the Adjutant General of the State of Delaware. He received the promotion in February 1999 after the retirement of Major General George Hastings. In April 2017, Vavala was promoted to general in the Delaware Militia in honor of 50 years of service. He is the first Delaware National Guardsman to achieve four-star rank and one of the very few American service members to have risen from private to four-star general.

As the Adjutant General, Vavala was the highest-ranking member of the Delaware National Guard. He was responsible for managing the affairs of the Army and Air National Guard and for advising Governor of the State of Delaware, who is the Commander-in-Chief of the Guard.

Early life and family
Vavala was born on June 28, 1947, in Elsmere, Delaware, the son of Frank and Nell Vavala. Vavala was raised with two other siblings, brother Gerard P. Vavala and sister Cissy E. Vavala-Gouert. He graduated from Salesianum School in 1965.

Vavala and his wife Jane reside in New Castle County, Delaware. They have a son, two daughters and three grandchildren. Before he was appointed as Adjutant General he was employed by DuPont as a Marketing Services Supervisor.

Military career

Vavala enlisted as a private in the Delaware Army National Guard in March 1967. He was commissioned in June 1970 after completing the Delaware Military Academy Officer Candidate School. Vavala has held a series of key command and staff positions. Prior to his assignment as the Adjutant General, he served in the following key assignments: corps tactical operations center platoon leader, Company A 198th Signal Battalion (United States); company commander, Company C 198th Signal Battalion; executive officer (XO) and battalion commander, 198th Signal Battalion; Operations Officer, Headquarters and Headquarters Detachment, Delaware Army National Guard; Communications Systems Engineer, Wire Communications Technical Engineer, Traffic Officer, Chief of Staff and Deputy Commander, 261st Theater Tactical Signal Brigade; Commander, Troop Command; Director of Plans, Operations, Training, and Military Support, Deputy Commander, and Assistant Adjutant General, State Area Command Headquarters, Delaware Army National Guard. From February 1999 to February 2017 the Adjutant General, Delaware National Guard.

2005 Base Realignment and Closure
Vavala lobbied against the 2005 Base Realignment and Closure Commission's recommendation to remove all the C-130 Hercules aircraft from the New Castle Air National Guard Base to bases in North Carolina and Georgia. Vavala worked with local elected officials and military leaders to stop the removal of these aircraft which would have effectively shut down the 166th Airlift Wing.

National Guard Defense Enhancement and National Guard Empowerment Act (H.R. 5200 and S. 2658)
As the Vice President and then President of the Adjutants General Association of the United States (AGAUS) and the Chairman of the National Guard Association of the United States (NGAUS) Vavala worked for the passage of what is known as the National Guard Empowerment Act. This act allows the National Guard chief, a four-star general, to be designated as member of the Joint Chiefs of Staff. The bill was introduced by Sen. Christopher S. Bond, R-Missouri, and Sen. Patrick Leahy, D-Vermont. On June 13, 2006, Vavala spoke before the House Armed Services Committee. He said in part:
We do not accept the premise that all good ideas relating to the National Guard are reserved for the Department of Defense. We don't want to confront the DoD-we want to work with them. We also want our Chief, Lieutenant General H Steven Blum, to be permitted to fulfill the role of Chief, National Guard Bureau, which is to serve as the link of communication between the states and DoD. Just as Air Force commanders and Army division commanders, the Adjutants General are the best source for information about organizational health and readiness. Lieutenant General Blum is the most competent senior official in the nation to deal with the health and future of the entire National Guard institution.

On January 26, 2012, the Delaware House of Representatives 146th General Assembly passed House Joint Resolution No. 10 recognizing Vavala for his leading role in reshaping the Military of the United States of America.

War on Terror
After the attacks of September 11, 2001, the role of the National Guard in American defense policy changed as National Guard units were regularly deployed overseas. 

Vavala was in command when units of the Delaware Army and Air National Guard were integrated with active duty forces in support of Operation Enduring Freedom and Operation Iraqi Freedom in Iraq, Afghanistan, Kuwait, Saudi Arabia, and Kyrgyzstan.

Domestic operations

Hurricane Katrina
On August 31, 2005, "Task Force Delaware" composed of the 166th Security Forces of the Delaware Air National and the 153rd Military Police Company (United States) of the Delaware Army Guard deployed to Gulfport, Mississippi, in response to Hurricane Katrina. These were the first of over four hundred members of the Delaware Guard who, under the direction of the Delaware Guard leadership and local authorities, participated in relief efforts on the Gulf Coast.

Hurricane Gustav
When Hurricane Gustav hit Louisiana on  September 1, 2008, the Delaware Air National Guard evacuated 285 hospital patients from potentially dangerous areas in Louisiana and Texas. The Delaware Air and Army National Guard sent two Black Hawk helicopters, communications and search and rescue specialists, as well as a Joint Enabling Team (JET).

War on Hunger
Vavala initiated a program entitled the "War on Hunger" in December 2008 which placed food donation sites in all Delaware Army and Air National Guard facilities as well as National Guard supported events. Food collected through this program is delivered to the Food Bank of Delaware to help feed families at risk in Delaware. Funds were also raised through the War On Hunger program to support the Food Bank's Backpack Program for children who experience hunger on weekends and when school is not in session.

Honors
1985
St. Anthony Of Padua Youth Activities Council Man of the Year Award.
1992
E.I. DuPont de Nemours and Company, Chestnut Run Plaza Work/Life Award.
2003
Salesianum School Hall of Fame.
2005
Columbus Day Communion Breakfast Committee, Italian American of the Year.

Civic affiliations
National Guard Association of Delaware, Association of the United States Army (AUSA), Knights of Columbus, Enlisted Association of the National Guard of the United States, Warrant Officer Association of the United States, Air Force Association (AFA), Signal Corps Regimental Association, Delaware Medal of Honor Historical Association, Military Officers Association of America (MOAA), the American Legion and the Sons of the American Revolution (SAR).

Education
In 1984 Vavala received a Bachelor of Science degree in Business Management from Wilmington University. His military education includes the signal officer basic and advanced courses and the Command and General Staff College at Fort Leavenworth, Kansas.

Dates of rank

Awards and decorations

Delaware National Guard

See also

 List of United States Army four-star generals

Notes

References
 Broomall, Hugh T., (1999). ''Integration of the National Guard into the Total Force. Thesis. United States Army War College, Pennsylvania.
 Kim, Suzanne M., (2007). Applying New Institutionalism to the National Guard Empowerment Act. M. Sc Thesis. Naval Postgraduate School, California.

External links

Army National Guard official biography

Military personnel from Delaware
Recipients of the Legion of Merit
Wilmington University alumni
National Guard (United States) generals
United States Army Command and General Staff College alumni
American people of Italian descent
1947 births
Living people
Recipients of the Meritorious Service Medal (United States)
Salesianum School alumni